The Ilovlya is a river in Saratov and Volgograd Oblasts of Russia.

The river is frozen over from December to March. In earlier times there was a portage here, between the watersheds of the Volga River and Don River.

References

Rivers of Saratov Oblast
Rivers of Volgograd Oblast